Pastrami (Turkish: pastırma) is a food originating from Asia Minor usually made from beef brisket. Later recipes use lamb, pork, chicken or turkey. The raw meat is brined, partially dried, seasoned with herbs and spices, then smoked and steamed. Like corned beef, pastrami was originally created as a way to preserve meat before the invention of refrigeration. One of the iconic meats of Eastern European cuisine as well as American Jewish cuisine and the New York City cuisine, hot pastrami is typically served at delicatessen restaurants on sandwiches such as the pastrami on rye.

Etymology and origin
The name pastrami comes from the Turkish pastırma, derived from the Turkish verb bastırma meaning "to press".

Wind-dried beef had been made in Anatolia for centuries, and Byzantine dried meat is thought by some to be "one of the forerunners of the pastırma of modern Turkey."

Pastrami was introduced to the United States in a wave of Jewish immigration from Bessarabia and Romania in the second half of the 19th century. The modified "pastrami" spelling was probably introduced in imitation of the American English salami. Romanian Jews emigrated to New York as early as 1872. Among Jewish Romanians, goose breasts were commonly made into pastrami because they were available. Beef navel was cheaper than goose meat in America, so the Romanian Jews in America adapted their recipe and began to make the cheaper-alternative beef pastrami.

New York's Sussman Volk is generally credited with producing the first pastrami sandwich in the United States in 1887. Volk, a kosher butcher and New York immigrant from Lithuania. According to his descendant, Patricia Volk, he prepared pastrami according to recipe of Romanian friend and served it on sandwiches out of his butcher shop. The sandwich was so popular that Volk converted the butcher shop into a restaurant to sell pastrami sandwiches.

Preparation and serving

Beef plate is the traditional cut of meat for making pastrami, although it is now common in the United States to see it made from beef brisket, beef round, and turkey. New York pastrami is generally made from beef navel, which is the ventral part of the plate. It is cured in brine, coated with a mix of spices such as garlic, coriander, black pepper, paprika, cloves, allspice, and mustard seed, and then smoked. Finally, the meat is steamed until the connective tissues within the meat break down into gelatin.

Greek immigrants to Salt Lake City in the early 1960s introduced a cheeseburger topped with pastrami and a special sauce. The pastrami cheeseburger has since remained a staple of local burger chains in Utah.

See also

List of dried foods
List of smoked foods

Pastrami on rye

References

Smoked meat
Dried meat
Beef
Lunch meat
Jewish American cuisine
Turkish words and phrases
Romanian cuisine
Cuisine of New York City